Pedro Galasso (19 January 1930 – 25 August 2007) was a Brazilian boxer. He competed in the men's featherweight event at the 1952 Summer Olympics.

References

1930 births
2007 deaths
Brazilian male boxers
Olympic boxers of Brazil
Boxers at the 1952 Summer Olympics
Sportspeople from São Paulo
Featherweight boxers